This is a list of castles in the Netherlands per province.

Overview of castles in the Netherlands

Drenthe
See also List of havezates in Drenthe

Flevoland

Friesland
See List of stins in Friesland

Gelderland

Groningen
See List of borgs in Groningen (province)

Limburg

North Brabant

North Holland

Overijssel

South Holland

Utrecht
See also List of manors in Utrecht

Zeeland

See also
List of castles
List of borgs in Groningen (province)
List of havezates in Drenthe
List of manors in Utrecht
List of stins in Friesland

References
Helsdingen, H.W. van, Gids voor de Nederlandse kastelen en buitenplaatsen, Amsterdam 1966
Kransber, D. & H. Mils, Kastelengids van Nederland, middeleeuwen, Bussem 1979
Kalkwiek, K.A., A.I.J.M. Schellart, H.P.H. Jansen & P.W. Geudeke, Atlas van de Nederlandse kastelen, Alphen aan den Rijn 1980
Tromp, H.M.J., Kijk op kastelen, Amsterdam 1979

External links
Castles in the Netherlands (in Dutch)
Castles and Country seats in Holland and Zeeland
Castles in Overijssel (in Dutch)
Castles in Gelderland (in Dutch)